Suikerbosrand Nature Reserve is a protected area in the Suikerbosrand Range, South Africa. It is one of Gauteng’s most frequented ecotourism destinations. Set just a short distance from Johannesburg, an hour's drive from Johannesburg International Airport and near the historical town of Heidelberg, this reserve boasts a representative sample of the fauna and flora of the rocky Highveld grassland biome. With  of unspoiled natural environment and a mountain range characterised by meandering twists and turns of hiking trails, the reserve offers an unbelievably refreshing break from the bustling city life.

The Suikerbosrand ridge was originally named after a sweet reed (probably sweet sorghum) found growing here by the party of general Hendrik Potgieter on 5 June 1836. Later the ridge and consequently the reserve's name became associated with the characteristic Transvaal-sugar bush (Protea caffra), a dominant vegetation type within the area's limits.

Management
Recent land acquisitions at the beginning of the twenty-first century have seen the reserve almost double in its size. A huge challenge for the reserve's management is to include the newly acquired lands in the reserve without disturbing the balance within the original area. The Suikerbosrand Nature Reserve is managed by the Gauteng province's Department of Agriculture, Conservation, Environment and Land Affairs, South Africa.

Wildlife
Over 200 bird species have been identified in the reserve. The reserve is also a habitat for a large range of mammal species including:

Cycling and mountain biking

The reserve is popular amongst mountain bikers and road cyclists for its quiet roads and trails, scenery, steep climbs, and fast twisting descents.

Hiking
The reserve includes a Visitors' Centre and the Diepkloof Farm Museum. The reserve can be explored on foot using several of the day and overnight hiking trails.

Holiday resort
A holiday resort for day visitors (apparently day visitors are no longer allowed in at Kareekloof) and overnight campers is situated within the nature reserve. (It was previously known as Kareekloof)

Accommodation is in the form of chalets, caravan (some with 240 V power) and tent sites.

See also
 Protected areas of South Africa

Notes

External links

 Footprints hiking club information on the trail

Gauteng Parks
Protected areas of South Africa